Reverie is an action-adventure video game developed by New Zealand-based indie studio Rainbite, first released on 5 April 2018.

Gameplay 
Reverie features open world exploration, real-time combat, dungeons and boss fights inspired by New Zealand's history, culture and environment, showing influences from classic SNES games including EarthBound and The Legend of Zelda: A Link to the Past.

Development 

In February 2019, Reverie: Sweet As Edition released on Nintendo Switch with added features. Reverie is Rainbite's first video game and released on the PlayStation 4, PlayStation Vita, and later the Nintendo Switch. Social media promotion kept the marketing budget to "zero dollars", instead engaging with Twitch streamers and passionate users of the PlayStation Vita library to build a fanbase.

Critical response 

The game received "mixed or average reviews", according to review aggregator Metacritic.

References 

2018 video games
Action-adventure games
Nintendo Switch games
PlayStation 4 games
PlayStation Vita games
Video games developed in New Zealand
Video games set in New Zealand